The Alister Clark Stakes is a Moonee Valley Racing Club Group 2 Thoroughbred horse race, for three-year-olds, at Set Weights, over a distance of 2040 metres, held annually usually at Moonee Valley Racecourse, Melbourne on a Friday night in March. Total prize money for the race is A$750,000.

History

The race is named after Alister Clark, the foundation chairman of the Moonee Valley Racing Club and master of Oaklands Hunt Club from 1901 to 1908.
He was also the pre-eminent Australian rose breeder of the twentieth century.

The race was first run in 1939 and has had changes in distance and grade. The race at times has been a Weight-for-age event for 3-year-olds and over as evident in 1977 when champion three-year-old filly Surround won the race.

1952 Racebook

Grade
 1939–1977 was a Principal race
 1979 onwards Group 2

Distance
 1939–1947 – 1 mile (~1600 metres)
 1948–1963 –  miles (~2000 metres)
 1964–1972 – 1 mile (~1600 metres)
 1973–1986 – 1600 metres
 1987–1994 – 2040 metres
 1995 – 2000 metres 
 1996–1997 – 2040 metres
 1998–2000 – 1600 metres
 2001 – 1509 metres
 2002–2010 – 1600 metres
 2011 onwards –  2040 metres

Venue
In 1995 the event was held at Flemington.

Winners

 2022 - Prix De Turn
 2021 - Grandslam
 2020 – Nonconformist
 2019 – Global Exchange
 2018 – Cliff's Edge
 2017 – Hardham
 2016 – Tally
 2015 – Chill Party
 2014 – Pheidon
 2013 – Philippi 
 2012 – Highly Recommended
 2011 – Domesky
 2010 – Linton
 2009 – Pre Eminence
 2008 – Sound Journey
 2007 – Casino Prince
 2006 – Spinney
 2005 – Lieutenant
 2004 – Speedy King
 2003 – Titanic Jack
 2002 – Royal Code
 2001 – Mr. Murphy
 2000 – Pins
 1999 – Dignity Dancer
 1998 – Zonda
 1997 – Flak Jacket
 1996 – Scenic Royale
 1995 – Blevic
 1994 – Tristalove
 1993 – Sarason
 1992 – Naturalism
 1991 – Durbridge
 1990 – Zabeel
 1989 – Bar Landy
 1988 – Flotilla
 1987 – Vo Rogue
 1986 – Lockley's Tradition
 1985 – King Phoenix
 1984 – Penny Edition
 1983 – My Evita
 1982 – Fearless Pride
 1981 – My Brown Jug
 1980 – Bit of a Skite
 1979 – Family Of Man
 1978 – race not held
 1977 – †Family Of Man / Surround
 1976 – Leica Show
 1975 – race not held
 1974 – Toltrice
 1973 – The Frigate
 1972 – Upstairs
 1971 – Tauto
 1970 – Cyron
 1969 – Begonia Belle
 1968 – Heroic Stone
 1967 – race not held
 1966 – Bowl King
 1965 – Sir Dane
 1964 – Sometime
 1963 – Sometime
 1962 – Aquanita
 1961 – Dhaulagiri
 1960 – Stormy Passage
 1959 – Wiggle
 1958 – Baron Boissier
 1957 – Mac's Amber
 1956 – Glitzern
 1955 – St. Joel
 1954 – Gallant Archer
 1953 – Hydrogen
 1952 – Step Aside
 1951 – Chicquita
 1950 – Comic Court
 1949 – Filipino
 1948 – Money Moon
 1947 – St. Fairy 
 1946 – Reperio
 1945 – Simmering
 1944 – Lilette
 1943 – Athol Belle
 1942 – ‡Tranquil Star / Prince Ronald
 1941 – Zonda
 1940 – Pure Gold
 1939 – Amiable

† Dead heat
‡ Race run in Divisions

See also
 List of Australian Group races
Group races

References

Horse races in Australia